Šliužiai is a village in Kėdainiai district municipality, in Kaunas County, in central Lithuania. According to the 2011 census, the village was uninhabited.

It is a part of Šliužiai village, split from Raseiniai District Municipality during the Soviet era.

Demography

References

Villages in Kaunas County
Kėdainiai District Municipality